Ourselves Alone may refer to:
Ourselves Alone (slogan), inaccurate translation of sinn féin
Ourselves Alone (film), 1936 British film 
Ourselves Alone (Boardwalk Empire), second episode of the second season 
Ourselves Alone (Terminator: The Sarah Connor Chronicles), seventeenth episode of the second season

See also
Not for Ourselves Alone 
Non nobis solum